The Vienna Technical Museum is located in Vienna (Austria), in the Penzing district, at Mariahilferstraße 212.

The decision to establish a technical museum was made in 1908, and construction of the building started in 1909. On June 20, 1909, Emperor Franz Josef laid the foundation stone. The museum was opened in 1918.

The permanent exhibition categories include: Nature and Knowledge: astronomy, principals, physics; Heavy industry: mining, iron, steel; Energy; Mass production - luxury goods; Everyday life - directions for use; Communications and information media; Musical instruments; Transport; Basic Research - A great adventure.

Gallery

References

External links

 

Museums established in 1918
Museums in Vienna
Technology museums
Science museums in Austria
1918 establishments in Austria
Industry museums
Buildings and structures in Penzing (Vienna)
20th-century architecture in Austria